Alessandra Camila Bueno Fontaine, (born November 21, 1991) is a Panamanian model and beauty pageant titleholder who winner of the Miss Panama World 2016 title on September 1, 2016, for Miss World 2016 contest in the United States.

Miss Panamá World 2016

The election of Señorita Panamá Mundo 2016 took place last night at the Grand Ballroom of the Trump International Hotel in Panama City. The winner is from Panama City, who was crowned by last year's representative in Miss World in Sanya, Diana Jaén.

Miss World 2016

Alessandra represented Panama at Miss World 2016 pageant but Unplaced.

See also
 Miss Panamá 2016

References

External links
 Miss Panama Official Web Page

Panamanian female models
1991 births
Living people
Panamanian beauty pageant winners
Señorita Panamá
Miss World 2016 delegates